John McGillivray (7 March 1886 – 1977) was an English footballer who played in the played in the Football League for Manchester United. He also played for Southport Central, Stoke and Dartford.

Career
McGillivray was born in Broughton, Lancashire and began his career with Manchester United. He spent two seasons at Old Trafford playing in four matches in 1907–08 and 1908–09 before he was released. He joined Southport Central and then played 25 times for Southern League side Stoke in 1911–12. He later played for Dartford.

Career statistics

References

External links
MUFCInfo.com profile

1886 births
1977 deaths
People from Broughton, Greater Manchester
Sportspeople from Lancashire
English footballers
Manchester United F.C. players
Southport F.C. players
Stoke City F.C. players
Association football wing halves
Dartford F.C. players
English Football League players